Huérfanas is a Mexican telenovela produced by Azteca. It stars Ana Belena & Fernando Alonso as the protagonists. Mariana Torres portrays a villain character for the first time. Other villains include Ana Ciochetti and Ariel López Padilla. Rodrigo Cachero, Carla Carillo, Lucia Leyba, Hugo Catalan, Eugenio Montesoro, Mayra Sierra, Rodrigo Murray and Gabriela Roel are also part of cast members. Fernando Ciangherotti and Veronica Merchant make a special appearance as the parents of the orphans. This telenovela will be produced by Corazon TV under Fernando Sariñana and Alberto Santini Lara for Azteca Novelas.
The shooting of started on 18 May 2011. An original story by Adriano Numa ("Cosa de niños: Bullying" & "Venenos cotidianos"), directed by Walter Doehner (La Reina del Sur), this original telenovela is scheduled to air at 6:00pm on August 29, 2011 on Azteca13.

Casts
Cast listing in opening credit order. Main cast (credited alone, or paired) in bold.

References

External links
Seriesnow

2011 telenovelas
2011 Mexican television series debuts
2012 Mexican television series endings
Mexican telenovelas
TV Azteca telenovelas
Spanish-language telenovelas